A Product Licence Number (or PL code for short) is a unique identifier on the packaging of medicines, used to uniquely identify the product. This code will normally remain the same despite the varying marketing and branding of the companies selling it.

The code itself is issued by the Medicines and Healthcare products Regulatory Agency in the UK and the European Medicines Agency.

References 

Identifiers
Unique identifiers
Medical regulation in the United Kingdom